This page lists all earldoms, extant, extinct, dormant, abeyant, or forfeit, in the peerages of England, Scotland, Great Britain, Ireland and the United Kingdom.

The Norman conquest of England introduced the continental Frankish title of "count" (comes) into England, which soon became identified with the previous titles of Danish "jarl" and Anglo-Saxon "earl" in England.  Until the reign of Edward III in the 14th century, the peerage of England consisted exclusively of earls and barons.

It remains a matter of debate whether early Anglo-Norman counts/earls held their title by tenure (as barons did) or as a personal dignity conferred separately from the land grants. At least three types of early earldoms can be distinguished - (1) earls palatine (e.g. Chester, Pembroke, Durham) whose titles were connected to entire counties, with regal jurisdiction (jura regalia) and enjoying full privileges and fruits of royal seigniory,  (2) earldoms created by the king and appointed to a county, but only enjoying right to a third of the profits of the pleas of the county court; (3) earldoms created by royal grants of large tracts of land to be held in feudal service (per servitum unius comitatus), erecting the tract to a county to support the earldom.  Nonetheless, for the last few centuries of English history, earldoms have always been created by letters patent or charters, and the volume of earldoms has long exceeded the number of territorial counties, and, as a result, the names of many earldoms are associated with smaller units (estates, villages, families, etc.).

Earldoms in England before 1066

Earldoms in the Peerage of England, 1066–1707

Earldoms in the Peerage of Scotland, 1072–1707

Earldoms in the Peerage of Great Britain, 1707–1801

Earldoms in the Peerage of Ireland, 1205–1831

Earldoms in the Peerage of the United Kingdom, 1801 to present
 
{|class="wikitable sortable"
!Title
!Date of creation
!Surname
!Current status
!Notes
|-
| style="background:#ADD8E6;"|Earl of Rosslyn||||Wedderburn, St. Clair-Erskine||extant||
|-
| style="background:#ADD8E6;"|Earl of Onslow||||Onslow||extant||
|-
| style="background:#ADD8E6;"|Earl of Craven||||Craven||extant||
|-
| style="background:#ADD8E6;"|Earl of Romney||||Marsham||extant||
|-
| style="background:#ADD8E6;"|Earl of Chichester||||Pelham||extant||
|-
| style="background:#ADD8E6;"|Earl of Wilton||||Egerton||extant||
|-
|Earl of Inverness||||Guelph||extinct 21 April 1843||subsidiary title of the Duke of York
|-
|Earl of Tipperary||||Guelph||extinct 17 March 1904||subsidiary title of the Duke of Cambridge
|-
|data-sort-value="Earl of Bath"|Countess of Bath||||Murray-Pulteney||extinct 14 July 1808||
|-
| style="background:#ADD8E6;"|Earl of Powis||||Clive||extant||
|-
| style="background:#ADD8E6;" data-sort-value="Earl of Nelson"|Earl Nelson||||Nelson||extant||
|-
|data-sort-value="Earl of Manvers"|Earl Manvers||||Pierrepont, Medows||extinct 13 February 1955||
|-
|Earl of Orford||||Walpole||extinct 27 September 1931||
|-
| style="background:#ADD8E6;" data-sort-value="Earl of Grey"|Earl Grey||||Grey||extant||
|-
| style="background:#ADD8E6;"|Earl of Lonsdale||||Lowther||extant||
|-
| style="background:#ADD8E6;"|Earl of Harrowby||||Ryder||extant||
|-
| style="background:#ADD8E6;"|Earl of Wellington||||Wellesley||extant||created Marquess of Wellington in 1812 and Duke of Wellington in 1814; also Earl of Mornington from 1863
|-
| style="background:#ADD8E6;" data-sort-value="Earl of Compton"|Earl Compton||||Compton||extant||subsidiary title of the Marquess of Northampton
|-
| style="background:#ADD8E6;"|Earl of Brecknock||||Pratt||extant||subsidiary title of the Marquess Camden
|-
| style="background:#ADD8E6;"|Earl of Mulgrave||||Phipps||extant||created Marquess of Normanby in 1838
|-
| style="background:#ADD8E6;"|Earl of Harewood||||Lascelles||extant||
|-
| style="background:#ADD8E6;"|Earl of Minto||||Elliot||extant||
|-
| style="background:#ADD8E6;" data-sort-value="Earl of Cathcart"|Earl Cathcart||||Cathcart||extant||
|-
|data-sort-value="Earl of Brownlow"|Earl Brownlow||||Cust||extinct 17 March 1921||
|-
| style="background:#ADD8E6;"|Earl of Rocksavage||||Cholmondeley||extant||subsidiary title of the Marquess of Cholmondeley, also Earl of Cholmondeley in England
|-
| style="background:#ADD8E6;"|Earl of Verulam||||Grimston||extant||
|-
|data-sort-value="Earl of Whitworth"|Earl Whitworth||||Whitworth||extinct 12 May 1825||
|-
| style="background:#ADD8E6;" data-sort-value="Earl of Saint Germans"|Earl of St Germans||||Eliot||extant||
|-
| style="background:#ADD8E6;"|Earl of Morley||||Parker||extant||
|-
| style="background:#ADD8E6;"|Earl of Bradford||||Bridgeman||extant||
|-
|data-sort-value="Earl of Beauchamp"|Earl Beauchamp||||Lygon||extinct 3 January 1979||
|-
|data-sort-value="Earl of de Grey"|Countess de Grey||||Robinson||extinct 22 September 1923||also Earl of Ripon from 1859; created Marquess of Ripon in 1871
|-
|Earl of Rawdon||||Rawdon||extinct 1 November 1868||subsidiary title of the Marquess of Hastings; also Earl of Moira in Ireland
|-
| style="background:#ADD8E6;"|Earl of Eldon||||Scott||extant||
|-
| style="background:#ADD8E6;" data-sort-value="Earl of Bruce"|Earl Bruce||||Bruce||extant||subsidiary title of the Marquess of Ailesbury, also Earl of Ailesbury in Great Britain, also Earl of Cardigan in England from 1856
|-
|Earl of Falmouth||||Boscawen||extinct 29 August 1852||
|-
| style="background:#ADD8E6;" data-sort-value="Earl of Howe"|Earl Howe||||Curzon||extant||
|-
|data-sort-value="Earl of Somers"|Earl Somers||||Somers-Cocks||extinct 26 September 1883||
|-
| style="background:#ADD8E6;"|Earl of Stradbroke||||Rous||extant||
|-
| style="background:#ADD8E6;" data-sort-value="Earl of Temple of Stowe"|Earl Temple of Stowe||||Temple-Gore-Langton||extant||also Duke of Buckingham and Chandos until 1889
|-
| style="background:#ADD8E6;" data-sort-value="Earl of Vane"|Earl Vane||||Stewart||extant||also Marquess of Londonderry and Earl of Londonderry in Ireland to 1854 and from 1872
|-
| style="background:#ADD8E6;" data-sort-value="Earl of Jermyn"|Earl Jermyn||||Jermyn||extant||subsidiary title of the Marquess of Bristol
|-
|data-sort-value="Earl of Amherst"|Earl Amherst||||Amherst||extinct 4 March 1993||
|-
| style="background:#ADD8E6;" data-sort-value="Earl of Cawdor"|Earl Cawdor||||Campbell||extant||
|-
|Earl of Dudley||||Ward||extinct 6 March 1833||
|-
|Earl of Munster||||Fitzclarence||extinct 30 December 2000||
|-
|Earl of Ormelie||||Campbell||extinct 8 November 1862||subsidiary title of the Marquess of Breadalbane
|-
| style="background:#ADD8E6;"|Earl of Burlington||||Cavendish||extant||also Duke of Devonshire from 1858
|-
|Earl of Camperdown||||Haldane-Duncan||extinct 5 December 1933||
|-
| style="background:#ADD8E6;"|Earl of Lichfield||||Anson||extant||
|-
| style="background:#ADD8E6;"|Earl of Durham||||Lambton||extant||
|-
|Earl of Ripon||||Robinson||extinct 1923||also Earl de Grey from 1859; created Marquess of Ripon in 1871
|-
| style="background:#ADD8E6;" data-sort-value="Earl of Granville"|Earl Granville||||Leveson-Gower||extant||
|-
| style="background:#ADD8E6;"|Earl of Effingham||||Howard||extant||
|-
| style="background:#ADD8E6;"|Earl of Ducie||||Moreton||extant||
|-
| style="background:#ADD8E6;"|Earl of Yarborough||||Anderson-Pelham||extant||
|-
| style="background:#ADD8E6;" data-sort-value="Earl of Innes"|Earl Innes||||Innes||extant||also Duke of Roxburghe
|-
| style="background:#ADD8E6;"|Earl of Leicester||||Coke||extant||
|-
|Earl of Lovelace||||King||extinct 31 January 2018||
|-
| style="background:#ADD8E6;"|Earl of Zetland||||Dundas||extant||created Marquess of Zetland and Earl of Ronaldshay in 1892
|-
|Earl of Auckland||||Eden||extinct 1 January 1849||
|-
|data-sort-value="Earl of Fitzhardinge"|Earl FitzHardinge||||Berkeley||extinct 10 October 1857||
|-
| style="background:#ADD8E6;"|Earl of Gainsborough||||Noel||extant||
|-
|Earl of Ellenborough||||Law||extinct 22 December 1871||
|-
| style="background:#ADD8E6;"|Earl of Ellesmere||||Leveson-Gower||extant||also Duke of Sutherland from 1963
|-
| style="background:#ADD8E6;"|Earl of Strafford||||Byng||extant||
|-
|Earl of Dublin||||Wettin||merged in crown 22 January 1901||also Prince of Wales, Duke of Cornwall and Earl of Chester in England and Duke of Rothesay and Earl of Carrick in Scotland
|-
| style="background:#ADD8E6;"|Earl of Cottenham||||Pepys||extant||
|-
| style="background:#ADD8E6;" data-sort-value="Earl of Cowley"|Earl Cowley||||Wellesley||extant||
|-
|data-sort-value="Earl of Canning"|Earl Canning||||Canning||extinct 17 June 1862||
|-
| style="background:#ADD8E6;"|Earl of Winton||||Montgomerie||extant||also Earl of Eglinton in Scotland
|-
| style="background:#ADD8E6;"|Earl of Dudley||||Ward||extant||
|-
| style="background:#ADD8E6;" data-sort-value="Earl of Russell"|Earl Russell||||Russell||extant||
|-
| style="background:#ADD8E6;" data-sort-value="Earl of Cromartie"|Countess of Cromartie||||Mackenzie||extant||
|-
|data-sort-value="Earl of Saint Maur"|Earl St Maur||||St. Maur, Seymour||extinct 28 November 1885||also Duke of Somerset
|-
|Earl of Kent||||Wettin||extinct 30 July 1900||subsidiary title of the Duke of Edinburgh, created Earl of Ulster at the same time. 9th and last creation
|-
|Earl of Ulster||||Wettin||extinct 30 July 1900||subsidiary title of the Duke of Edinburgh, created Earl of Kent at the same time
|-
| style="background:#ADD8E6;"|Earl of Kimberley||||Wodehouse||extant||
|-
|Earl of Dartrey||||Dawson||extinct 9 February 1933||
|-
|Earl of Feversham||||Duncombe||extinct 4 September 1963||
|-
|Earl of Dufferin||||Hamilton-Temple-Blackwood||extinct 29 May 1988||created Marquess of Dufferin and Ava in 1888
|-
|data-sort-value="Earl of Sydney"|Earl Sydney||||Townshend||extinct 14 February 1890||
|-
|Earl of Ravensworth||||Liddell||extinct 7 February 1904||
|-
|Earl of Sussex||||Wettin||extinct 26 April 1943||subsidiary title of the Duke of Connaught and Strathearn
|-
| style="background:#ADD8E6;"|Earl of Kinrara||||Gordon-Lennox||extant||subsidiary title of the Duke of Gordon, also Duke of Richmond and Earl of March in England and Duke of Lennox and Earl of Darnley in Scotland
|-
| style="background:#ADD8E6;"|Earl of Lewes||||Nevill||extant||subsidiary title of the Marquess of Abergavenny, also Earl of Abergavenny in Great Britain
|-
| style="background:#ADD8E6;"|Earl of Wharncliffe||||Montagu-Stuart-Wortley-Mackenzie, Wortley||extant||
|-
|Earl of Northbrook||||Baring||extinct 12 April 1929||
|-
|Earl of Beaconsfield||||Disraeli||extinct 19 April 1881||
|-
|Earl of Redesdale||||Freeman-Mitford||extinct 2 May 1886||
|- 
| style="background:#ADD8E6;" data-sort-value="Earl of Cairns"|Earl Cairns||||Cairns||extant||
|-
| style="background:#ADD8E6;"|Earl of Lytton||||Bulwer-Lytton||extant||former Viceroy of India
|-
|Earl of Lathom||||Bootle-Wilbraham||extinct 6 February 1930||
|-
|data-sort-value="Earl of Sondes"|Earl Sondes||||Watson, Milles||extinct 2 December 1996||
|-
|Earl of Clarence||||Wettin||suspended 1919||subsidiary title of the Duke of Albany
|-
| style="background:#ADD8E6;"|Earl of Selborne||||Palmer||extant||
|-
| style="background:#ADD8E6;"|Earl of Iddesleigh||||Northcote||extant||
|-
|Earl of Ormelie||||Campbell||extinct 19 October 1922||subsidiary title of the Marquess of Breadalbane, also Earl of Breadalbane and Holland in Scotland
|-
|Earl of Fife||||Duff||extinct 29 January 1912||also Earl Fife; created Duke of Fife in 1889 and 1900
|-
|data-sort-value="Earl of de Montalt"|Earl de Montalt||||Maude||extinct 1905||
|-
|Earl of Londesborough||||Denison||extinct 17 April 1937||
|-
|Earl of Ava||||Hamilton-Temple-Blackwood||extinct 29 May 1988||subsidiary title of the Marquess of Dufferin and Ava
|-
|Earl of Athlone||||Wettin||extinct 14 January 1892||subsidiary title of the Duke of Clarence and Avondale
|-
|Earl of Inverness||||Wettin||merged in crown 1910||subsidiary title of the Duke of York
|-
|Earl of Ancaster||||Heathcote-Drummond- Willoughby||extinct 29 March 1983||
|-
| style="background:#ADD8E6;"|Earl of Cranbrook||||Gathorne-Hardy||extant||
|-
| style="background:#ADD8E6;"|Earl of Ronaldshay||||Dundas||extant||subsidiary title of the Marquess of Zetland, also Earl of Zetland
|-
|data-sort-value="Earl of Carrington"|Earl Carrington||||Wynn-Carrington, Carington||extinct 13 June 1928||created Marquess of Lincolnshire in 1912
|-
|Earl of Crewe||||Crewe-Milnes, Offley||extinct 20 June 1945||created Marquess of Crewe in 1911
|-
|data-sort-value="Earl of Egerton"|Earl Egerton||||Egerton||extinct 16 March 1909||
|-
|Earl of Halsbury||||Giffard||extinct 2010||
|-
| style="background:#ADD8E6;"|Earl of Macduff||||Carnegie||extant||subsidiary title of the Duke of Fife, also Duke of Fife, Marquess of Macduff and Earl of Fife until 1912 and Earl Fife in Ireland until 1912
|-
|data-sort-value="Earl of Roberts"|Earl Roberts||||Roberts, Lewin||extinct 21 February 1955||British Army officer; Commander-in-Chief of the Forces (from 1900 to 1904); former Commander-in-Chief of the British Forces in South Africa, Commander-in-Chief, Ireland, and Commander-in-Chief, India
|-
| style="background:#ADD8E6;"|Earl of Cromer||||Baring||extant||colonial administrator; Consul-General of Egypt (from 1883 to 1907)
|-
| style="background:#ADD8E6;"|Earl of Plymouth||||Windsor-Clive||extant||Conservative Party politician; former First Commissioner of Works (from 1902 to 1905)
|-
| style="background:#ADD8E6;"|Earl of Liverpool||||Foljambe||extant||Liberal Party politician; Lord Steward of the Household (from 1905 to 1907)
|-
|Earl of Madeley||||Crewe-Milnes, Offley||extinct 20 June 1945||subsidiary title of the Marquess of Crewe, also Earl of Crewe
|-
|data-sort-value="Earl of Loreburn"|Earl Loreburn||||Reid||extinct 30 November 1923||Liberal Party politician; Lord High Chancellor (from 1905 to 1912)
|-
| style="background:#ADD8E6;"|Earl of Midlothian||||Primrose||extant||former Prime Minister (from 1894 to 1895); also Earl of Rosebery in Scotland
|-
|data-sort-value="Earl of Brassey"|Earl Brassey||||Brassey||extinct 12 November 1919||Liberal Party politician; Lord Warden of the Cinque Ports (from 1908 to 1913); former Governor of Victoria (from 1895 to 1900)
|-
|data-sort-value="Earl of Curzon of Kedleston"|Earl Curzon of Kedleston||||Curzon||extinct 20 March 1925||Conservative Party politician; former Viceroy of India (from 1899 to 1905); created Marquess Curzon of Kedleston in 1921
|-
|data-sort-value="Earl of Kitchener"|Earl Kitchener||||Kitchener||extinct 16 December 2011||British Army officer and cabinet minister; Secretary of State for War (from 1914 to 1916); formerly British Consul-General in Egypt and Commander-in-Chief, India
|-
| style="background:#ADD8E6;" data-sort-value="Earl of Saint Aldwyn"|Earl St Aldwyn||||Hicks-Beach||extant||Conservative Party politician; former Chancellor of the Exchequer (from 1895 to 1902); elevated to an earldom following his work on government finances during the First World War
|-
| style="background:#ADD8E6;"|Earl of Haddo||||Gordon||extant||subsidiary title of the Marquess of Aberdeen and Temair
|-
|Earl of Eltham||||Cambridge||extinct 1981||subsidiary title of the Marquess of Cambridge
|-
|Earl of Athlone||||Cambridge||extinct 16 January 1957||cousin and brother-in-law of George V; ennobled after relinquishing his German titles
|-
| style="background:#ADD8E6;"|Earl of Medina||||Mountbatten||extant||subsidiary title of the Marquess of Milford Haven
|-
|Earl of Berkhampsted||||Mountbatten||extinct 23 February 1960||subsidiary title of the Marquess of Carisbrooke
|-
| style="background:#ADD8E6;"|Earl of Reading||||Isaacs||extant||Liberal Party politician; Lord Chief Justice of England (from 1913 to 1921) and former Attorney General (from 1910 to 1913); created Marquess of Reading in 1926.
|-
| style="background:#ADD8E6;" data-sort-value="Earl of Beatty"|Earl Beatty||||Beatty||extant||Royal Navy officer; Commander-in-Chief of the Grand Fleet (from 1916 to 1919)
|-
| style="background:#ADD8E6;" data-sort-value="Earl of Haig"|Earl Haig||||Haig||extant||British Army officer; Commander-in-Chief of the British Expeditionary Force (from 1915 to 1919)
|-
| style="background:#ADD8E6;"|Earl of Iveagh||||Guinness||extant||businessman and philanthropist
|-
|Earl of Midleton||||Brodrick||extinct 2 November 1979||Conservative Party and Irish Unionist Alliance politician; former leader of the latter (from 1910 to 1919) and a former cabinet minister 
|-
|Earl of Inverness||||Windsor||merged in crown 11 December 1936||subsidiary title of the Duke of York
|-
|data-sort-value="Earl of Buxton"|Earl Buxton||||Buxton||extinct 15 October 1934||Liberal Party politician and colonial administrator; Governor-General of South Africa (from 1914 to 1920)
|-
|Earl of Kedleston||||Curzon||extinct 20 March 1925||Conservative Party politician; Foreign Secretary (from 1919 to 1924); former Viceroy of India (from 1899 to 1905); subsidiary title of the Marquess Curzon of Kedleston
|-
| style="background:#ADD8E6;"|Earl of Balfour||||Balfour||extant||former Prime Minister (from 1902 to 1905)
|-
|Earl of Ypres||||French||extinct 1988||British Army officer; former Lord Lieutenant of Ireland (from 1918 to 1921), and Commander-in-Chief of the Home Forces (from 1915 to 1918) and of the British Expeditionary Force (from 1914 to 1915).
|-
|Earl of Birkenhead||||Smith||extinct 18 February 1985||Conservative Party politician and barrister; former Lord High Chancellor (from 1919 to 1922)
|-
|data-sort-value="Earl of Farquhar"|Earl Farquhar||||Townsend-Farquhar||extinct 30 August 1923||courtier, Conservative Party politician and financier; former Lord Steward of the Household (from 1915 to 1922)
|-
| style="background:#ADD8E6;"|Earl of Oxford and Asquith||||Asquith||extant||former Prime Minister (1908 to 1916)
|-
| style="background:#ADD8E6;" data-sort-value="Earl of Jellicoe"|Earl Jellicoe||||Jellicoeextant||former Governor-General of New Zealand (from 1920 to 1924); a senior Royal Navy officer
|-
| style="background:#ADD8E6;"|Earl of Ulster||||Windsor||extant||subsidiary title of the Duke of Gloucester
|-
|data-sort-value="Earl of Cave of Richmond"|Countess Cave of Richmond||||Cave||extinct 7 January 1938||widow of George Cave, 1st Viscount Cave, a Conservative Party politician who served as Lord High Chancellor and Home Secretary and had died in office
|-
| style="background:#ADD8E6;"|Earl of Inchcape||||Mackay||extant||businessman and colonial administrator
|-
| style="background:#ADD8E6;" data-sort-value="Earl of Peel"|Earl Peel||||Peel||extant||Conservative Party politician; former Secretary of State for India and First Commissioner of Works
|-
|Earl of Willingdon||||Freeman-Thomas||extinct 19 March 1979||Viceroy of India (from 1931 to 1936) and former Governor-General of Canada (from 1926 to 1931); created Marquess of Willingdon in 1936
|-
| style="background:#ADD8E6;" data-sort-value="Earl of Saint Andrews"|Earl of St Andrews||||Windsor||extant||subsidiary title of the Duke of Kent
|-
| style="background:#ADD8E6;"|Earl of Strathmore and Kinghorne||||Bowes-Lyon||extant||also Earl of Strathmore and Kinghorne in Scotland; father of Queen Elizabeth the Queen Mother
|-
|Earl of Bessborough||||Ponsonby||extinct 5 December 1993||also Earl of Bessborough in Ireland, which title is extant; former Governor-General of Canada (from 1931 to 1935)
|-
| style="background:#ADD8E6;" data-sort-value="Earl of Baldwin of Bewdley"|Earl Baldwin of Bewdley||||Baldwin||extant||former Prime Minister (from 1923 to 1924, from 1924 to 1929 and from 1935 to 1937)
|-
| style="background:#ADD8E6;"|Earl of Halifax||||Wood||extant||former Viceroy of India (from 1926 to 1931), Foreign Secretary and British Ambassador to the United States
|-
| style="background:#ADD8E6;" data-sort-value="Earl of Lloyd George"|Earl Lloyd-George of Dwyfor||||Lloyd-George||extant||former Prime Minister (from 1916 to 1922)
|-
| style="background:#ADD8E6;"|Earl of Gowrie||||Ruthven||extant||former Governor-General of Australia (from 1936 to 1945)
|-
|data-sort-value="Earl of Wavell"|Earl Wavell||||Wavell||extinct 24 December 1953||former Viceroy of India (from 1943 to 1947) and senior British Army officer
|-
| style="background:#ADD8E6;" data-sort-value="Earl of Mountbatten"|Earl Mountbatten of Burma||||Mountbatten||extant||former Viceroy of India (in 1947) and senior Royal Navy officer
|-
| Earl of Merioneth||||Mountbatten||merged in crown 8 September 2022||subsidiary title of the Duke of Edinburgh
|-
|data-sort-value="Earl of Jowitt"|Earl Jowitt||||Jowitt||extinct 16 August 1957||Labour Party politician; Lord High Chancellor from 1945 to 1951
|-
| style="background:#ADD8E6;" data-sort-value="Earl of Alexander of Tunis"|Earl Alexander of Tunis||||Alexander||extant||Governor-General of Canada from 1946 to 1952, and senior British Army officer
|-
| style="background:#ADD8E6;"|Earl of Swinton||||Cunliffe-Lister||extant||Conservative Party politician; former Secretary of State for Commonwealth Relations, for Air and for the Colonies, Chancellor of the Duchy of Lancaster and President of the Board of Trade
|-
| style="background:#ADD8E6;" data-sort-value="Earl of Attlee"|Earl Attlee||||Attlee||extant||former Prime Minister (from 1945 to 1951)
|-
| style="background:#ADD8E6;"|Earl of Woolton||||Marquis||extant||Conservative Party politician and businessman; Chairman of the Conservative Party from 1946 to 1955; Minister of Food and Minister of Reconstruction during the Second World War
|-
|Earl of Avon||||Eden||extinct 17 August 1985||former Prime Minister (from 1955 to 1957)
|-
| style="background:#ADD8E6;"|Earl of Snowdon||||Armstrong-Jones||extant||former husband of The Late Princess Margaret
|-
|Earl of Kilmuir||||Fyfe||extinct 27 January 1967||Conservative Party politician, lawyer and judge; Lord High Chancellor from 1954 to 1962
|-
|data-sort-value="Earl of Alexander of Hillsborough"|Earl Alexander of Hillsborough||||Alexander||extinct 1965||Labour Party politician; First Lord of the Admiralty during the Second World War and Minister of Defence from 1946 to 1950
|-
| style="background:#ADD8E6;"|Earl of Stockton||||Macmillan||extant||former Prime Minister (from 1957 to 1963)
|-
| style="background:#ADD8E6;"|Earl of Inverness||||Mountbatten-Windsor||extant||subsidiary title of the Duke of York
|-
| style="background:#ADD8E6;"|Earl of Wessex||||Mountbatten-Windsor||extant||subsidiary title of the Duke of Edinburgh (dukedom is for life, earldoms and viscountcy hereditary)
|-
| style="background:#ADD8E6;"|Earl of Strathearn||||Mountbatten-Windsor||extant||subsidiary title of the Duke of Cambridge
|-
| style="background:#ADD8E6;"|Earl of Dumbarton||||Mountbatten-Windsor||extant||subsidiary title of the Duke of Sussex
|-
| style="background:#ADD8E6;"|Earl of Forfar||||Mountbatten-Windsor||extant||subsidiary title of the Duke of Edinburgh (dukedom is for life, earldoms and viscountcy hereditary)
|-
|}

See also
British nobility
List of earls in the peerages of Britain and Ireland
List of earls in the reign of Richard III of England
List of the titled nobility of England and Ireland 1300–1309

References

 
 
Lists of peerages
Lists of peerages of Britain and Ireland